Troll i ord (Watch What You Say) is a Norwegian comedy film from 1954. The film was directed by Jon Lennart Mjøen and Olav Engebretsen.

The action in the film takes place at a hotel in the high mountains just before Easter. The main roles are played by the Norwegian actors Henki Kolstad, Inger Marie Andersen, and Guri Stormoen and the Danish actors Ib Schønberg and Jytte Ibsen. The alpinist Marius Eriksen Jr. plays a ski trainer, and the Marius sweater was featured in the film. Troll i ord also contains several song numbers, including the hit "Vinter i eventyrland" (Winter in Wonderland) with The Monn Keys. The outdoor scenes were filmed at Skeikampen in the municipality of Gausdal.

Cast
 Inger Marie Andersen as Ebba Winger
 Ib Schønberg as Ib Fjeldstrup
 Henki Kolstad as Knut Bakke
 Marius Eriksen Jr. as Ola Bervik
 Joachim Holst-Jensen as Joachim Tønnesen
 Jytte Ibsen as Mette Werner
 Guri Stormoen as Alvilde Tønnesen
 Per Asplin as a singing voice
 Nora Brockstedt as a singing voice
 Fredrik Conradi as a singing voice
 Oddvar Sanne as a singing voice
 Sølvi Wang as a singing voice
 Liv Wilse as a singer

References

External links
 
 Troll i ord at the National Library of Norway

1954 films
Norwegian comedy films
Norwegian black-and-white films
1954 comedy films
Films directed by Jon Lennart Mjøen